Jembatan akar (English: living root bridge) is the bridge that forms the fabric of the two roots of the trees that grow across and extends over a stream in the subdistrict Bayang Utara, Pesisir Selatan Regency, West Sumatra, Indonesia. It is located about 88 km south of the city of Padang. In the language of Minang, the bridge is the community outreach called titian aka.

It began to be formed in 1890 and could be used in 1916. In other words, the process of knitting a root bridge takes approximately 26 years. Currently, conditions are becoming increasingly stronger with the size of the roots of the banyan tree that formed it. On any day of the week and national holidays, the tourist attraction root bridge is much visited by local tourists and foreign tourists.

References 

West Sumatra
Tourist attractions in Sumatra